Laura Sumner (5 September 1921–18 June 1993) was an American classical numismatist and poet, who was a professor at the University of Mary Washington.

Biography 
Laura Bennett Voelkel was born on 5 September 1921 in Brooklyn to John and Laura Bennett Voelkel. She studied for her undergraduate degree at Vassar College and graduated in 1942. She then studied for her MA at Johns Hopkins University, graduating in 1943. Sumner continued to study there for her PhD, which she was awarded in 1945 for a thesis entitled “The Coin Types of the Emperor Domitian”.

In 1945 Sumner was appointed as Assistant Professor of History of Art at Wesleyan College in Georgia, where she taught for two years. In 1947 she was appointed Assistant Professor at Mary Washington College, where she was to teach for the subsequent thirty-two years. Sumner was dedicated to teaching and pedagogy, with many students remembering her with enthusiasm. This meant that she did not publish widely. However she did work on both the excavations in 1963 and the subsequent catalogue of the coins from Kenchreai. She was passionate about the ability that numismatics had to "make the past come alive for students". Other publications included a commentary on the Lusiads. She was also involved with Mary Washington's archaeology society.

Sumner also held multiple Visiting Fellowships at universities in the USA, including: University of Wisconsin, University of Iowa, Humanities Institute, Fairfax.

Awards and fellowships 
 Overseas Fellow of the Royal Numismatic Society. She was first elected in 1945.
 President (1970–71), Vice-President (1958-60) - Southern Section of the Classical Association of the Middle West and South.

Personal life 
In addition to her classical scholarship, Sumner also wrote and published poetry. She married Raiford Eve Sumner on 20 December 1953. She died on 18 June 1993 in Fredericksburg, Virginia.

References 

1921 births
1993 deaths
Women numismatists
American classical scholars
University of Mary Washington faculty
Vassar College alumni
American women poets
American numismatists
People from Brooklyn
Johns Hopkins University alumni
20th-century American women
20th-century American people
American women academics